Self Regional Healthcare, previously Self Memorial Hospital, is a 322-bed short-term acute care hospital founded on November 1, 1951 in Greenwood, South Carolina. Currently there are over 200 practicing physicians employed by Self Regional Healthcare. Of the 322 beds, 30 are ICU beds and 32 are emergency medical service beds.

History 
In June 2017 a jury awarded $1 million in a malpractice suit against Self Regional Healthcare and Dr. Mark Robirds.

In July 2014 a data breach occurred after the theft of an employee laptop.

Awards and Certifications 
Self Regional Healthcare
 is a 13-time winner of the Gallup Great Workplace Award.
 is verified by the American College of Surgeons as a Level III Trauma Center.
 received a grant from Susan G. Komen Mountains to Midlands to provide uninsured women with diagnostic testing for breast cancer.

References 

Hospitals established in 1951
Hospitals in South Carolina
Hospitals in the United States
1951 establishments in South Carolina
Trauma centers